The Razing of Kandanos refers to the complete destruction of the village of Kandanos in Western Crete (Greece) and the killing of about 180 of its inhabitants on 3 June 1941 by German occupying forces during World War II.

It was ordered by Generaloberst Kurt Student in reprisal for the participation of the local population in the Battle of Crete that had held advancing German soldiers for two days. The destruction constituted one of the most atrocious war crimes committed during the occupation of Crete by Axis forces in World War II.

Background

Local resistance
The Battle of Crete began on 20 May 1941 with a large-scale airborne invasion planned to capture the island's strategic locations. Kandanos is located on the road from Chania on the north coast to Paleochora in the south, which was a candidate landing point for potential Allied reinforcements from North Africa. The village of Kandanos had been bombed during the first days of the attack and a small motorized German detachment (riding motorcycles with MG 34 machine guns on their sidecars) attempted to move through it on 23 May 1941, aiming to reach and secure Paleochora. Albeit untrained and insufficiently armed, local civilians from Kandanos, Paleochora and nearby smaller villages with the assistance of a few Selino gendarmes, spontaneously confronted and fought the German force in Floria.

On the following day, the locals gathered in larger numbers and set an ambush for the advancing German troops of the 5th Gebirgsdivision (elements of the 55 motorcycle Battalion and the 95 anti-tank Battalion), at Kandanos' gorge.

Despite their strong resistance on 24 and 25 May and their limited casualties, the locals were vastly outnumbered and were thus eventually forced to retreat into the mountains, letting the Germans advance towards Paleochora.

The repercussions of the resistance
During the Battle of Crete, the invading German forces had suffered heavy losses. Furthermore, the unprecedented resistance from the local population exasperated their Prussian sense of military order according to which no one but professional warriors should be allowed to fight. Even before the end of the Battle, exaggerated stories had started to circulate, attributing the excessively high casualties to torture and mutilation of paratroopers by the Cretans.

Such stories proved to be false later on, as more careful investigations could identify only a few cases of mutilation all over Crete, most of which had been inflicted after death. Nevertheless, as a result of the above allegations and seeking to set an example, right after the surrender of Crete on 31 May, temporary commander General Kurt Student issued an order for launching a wave of brutal reprisals against the local population. The reprisals were to be carried out rapidly by the same units who had been confronted by the locals, omitting formalities.

The razing

On 3 June 1941, a day after executing several civilians in Kondomari, German troops from the III Battalion of the 1st Air Landing Assault Regiment (most probably led by Oberleutnant Horst Trebes) reached Kandanos, following Student's order for reprisals. The Germans killed about 180 residents and slaughtered all livestock; all houses were torched and razed.

Nearby villages such as Floria and Kakopetro met a similar fate. After its destruction, Kandanos was declared a 'dead zone' and its remaining population was forbidden to return to the village and rebuild it. Finally, inscriptions in German and Greek were erected on each entry of the village. One read: Here stood Kandanos, destroyed in retribution for the murder of 25 German soldiers, never to be rebuilt again.

Aftermath

A memorial to the fallen soldiers of the 95 Battalion was erected by the 5. Gebirgs Division near Floria after the surrender of Crete.

After the surrender of Germany, General Kurt Student was captured by the British. In May 1947, he came before a military tribunal to answer charges of mistreatment and murder of prisoners of war and civilians by his forces in Crete. Greece's demand to have Student extradited was declined. Student was found guilty of three out of eight charges and sentenced to five years in prison. However, he was given a medical discharge and was released in 1948. Student was acquitted for crimes against civilians, partially due to testimony given by Maj Gen Lindsay Merritt Inglis at his trial.

Today, Kandanos has been rebuilt and is the seat of the eponymous municipality. Reproductions of the sombre Wehrmacht signposts commemorating the destruction of the village are displayed on a local war memorial.

See also
Viannos massacres
Razing of Anogeia
Oradour-sur-Glane massacre
Lidice massacre
War crimes of the Wehrmacht

References

External links
Κάνδανος. 3 Ιουνίου 1941 , greekholocausts.gr. Archived copy
Kandanos from historic.de (in German -- translate)
Floria monument from historic.de (in German -- translate)

Conflicts in 1941
Mass murder in 1941
Nazi war crimes in Greece
1941 in Greece
Massacres in Greece during World War II
Battle of Crete
June 1941 events
Crete in World War II
War crimes of the Wehrmacht
Massacres committed by Nazi Germany